Kalan (also Romanized as Kalān) is a village in Ojarud-e Sharqi Rural District, Muran District, Germi County, Ardabil Province, Iran. At the 2006 census, its population was 456, in 70 families.

References 

Towns and villages in Germi County